SCAI may refer to:

 Specialty Coffee Association of Indonesia
 Scientific Computer Applications Inc.
 SCAI, the Fraunhofer-Institute for Algorithms and Scientific Computing, see Fraunhofer Society#Institutes